Armscote is a small village, some three miles north of Shipston-on-Stour in Warwickshire, England. It is located a mile off the A429 road which is the modern line of the Fosse Way Roman road. Population details can be found under Tredington. A major event of interest in the history of the village was the visit of George Fox, the famous Quaker founder. It was here in 1673 that he preached and was then arrested. The barn where the event of 1673 took place was demolished in 1680 to make way for a stone meeting house which still stands.

References

External links

Villages in Warwickshire